The Strawberry Fields music festivals were a series of large outdoor events in New Zealand, featuring music as the central theme. They are considered influential in the timeline of New Zealand rock music festivals.

Venue
The festivals were three-day events.

Associated events
Strawberry Fields Management also ran other festivals, such as the Raglan Blues & Roots Festival in April 2001. In 2009 ten local residents cited the local disruption allegedly caused by the Strawberry Fields events in the 1990s, when opposing a series of mini-festivals to be held on the same site.

References

External references
 Official web site Strawberry Fields Management Ltd
 1995 festival performance on youtube

Music festivals in New Zealand
Raglan, New Zealand